Moreira  may refer to:

Places
 Moreira (Maia), a parish in Maia Municipality, northern Portugal
 , a parish in Monção Municipality, northern Portugal
 , a parish in Nelas Municipality, central Portugal

People
Moreira (name), given name and surname, including a list of people with the name